Young v. Bristol Aeroplane Co Ltd ([1944] KB 718 CA) was an English court case that established that the Court of Appeal is bound to follow its own decisions and those of courts of co-ordinate jurisdiction, except in the following cases:

the court is entitled and bound to decide which of two previous conflicting decisions of its own it will follow;  
the court is bound to refuse to follow a decision of its own which cannot stand with a decision of the House of Lords; 
the court is not bound to follow a decision of its own if the decision was given per incuriam, e.g., where a statute or a rule having statutory effect which would have affected the decision was not brought to the attention of the earlier court.

There are a few other possible exceptions that may be worth considering. These are:

Decisions on interlocutory appeals, for example, decisions taken by a Court of Appeal of only two judges.
Where the decision from the House of Lords was made on an unwarranted assumption.
That the decision was made before the Human Rights Act 1998, and so may be contrary to it. (see Culnane v Morris & Anor–a case concerning qualified privilege–overruling Plummer v Chairman; Miller v Bull–which concerned a time extension to comply with the formalities under the Election Petition Rules 1960–which overruled Ahmed v Kennedy. The latter case, though heard after the HRA 1998 came into effect, had failed to consider whether the Human Rights Act had been breached.)

The decision of the Court of Appeal in R v James and Karimi may also have future implications regarding precedent and Privy Council decisions; the Court of Appeal deciding to follow the Privy Council ruling in Attorney-General for Jersey v Holley [2005] as opposed to the contentious House of Lords decision in R v Smith (Morgan James) [2001] in a case concerning defendant characteristics and provocation under s.3 of the Homicide Act 1957.

References

 Young v. Bristol Aeroplane Co Ltd

1944 in England
Court of Appeal (England and Wales) cases
1944 in case law
1944 in British law